DYTC may refer to:

 A call sign used by ABS-CBN Corporation in Tacloban
 DYTC-TV, a television station broadcasting as ABS-CBN S+A Tacloban
 DYTC-FM, an FM radio station broadcasting as MOR Tacloban